Academia del Balompié Boliviano, commonly known as ABB, is a Bolivian football club based in La Paz. Currently, it competes in the La Paz Regional League and Copa Bolivia. The team's home base is the Estadio Hernando Siles.

Football clubs in Bolivia
Football clubs in La Paz
Association football clubs established in 1995
1985 establishments in Bolivia